Lycée Évariste-Galois may refer to:
 Lycée Evariste Galois (Beaumont-sur-Oise) in Beaumont-sur-Oise
 Lycée Évariste Galois (Noisy-le-Grand)
 Lycée Évariste Galois (Sartrouville)